Laz Mosque   is a small mosque in the west of the medina of Tunis.

Localization
It is located in Dar El Jeld Street.

Etymology
The mosque got its name from the dey of Tunis Hadj Mohamed Laz, a janissary from Lazistan.

Description
According to the commemorative plaque, Hadj Mustapha Laz Dey was buried in the mosque.

References 

Mosques in Tunis
11th-century mosques